Mark Emil D'Onofrio (born March 17, 1969) is an American college football coach and former professional player. He is currently the inside linebackers coach for the Stanford Cardinal. He was formerly the defensive coordinator and inside linebackers coach for the University of Houston.  D'Onofrio played collegiately as a linebacker at Pennsylvania State University and thereafter was drafted by the Green Bay Packers of the National Football League (NFL).

Playing career
D'Onofrio played at the collegiate level with the Penn State Nittany Lions, where he was a team captain. In the 1992 NFL Draft, D'Onofrio was selected in the second round by the Green Bay Packers. He became a starter with the team that season, however a severe injury would cause him to retire soon after.

Coaching career
D'Onofrio's first coaching experience was as linebackers coach at Saint Peter's College. The next year, he became a defensive assistant with the Georgia Bulldogs. From there he was a linebackers coach with the Rutgers Scarlet Knights and tight ends, special teams, and inside linebackers coach with the Virginia Cavaliers. He joined the Temple Owls in 2006 as a defensive coordinator, later being promoted to the Assistant Head Coach/ Defensive Coordinator.

He followed head coach Al Golden to the University of Miami in the same position he held at Temple for the Miami Hurricanes football team in December 2010. Al Golden came to Coral Gables to replace Randy Shannon. After Golden was fired in the wake of a 58-0 loss to Clemson, D'Onofrio finished out the 2015 season as defensive coordinator and was then terminated following Miami's SunBowl loss to Washington State, 20-16. He spent 2016 out of football while coaching at the Boys & Girls Club in Miami.

On January 6, 2017, D'Onofrio was hired by the Houston Cougars as their defensive coordinator and inside linebackers coach, beginning with the 2017 season.

On November 25, 2018, Major Applewhite announced that D'Onofrio had been relieved of his duties as defensive coordinator at the University of Houston.

In early June of 2022, it was reported that D'Onofrio would be hired by Paul Chryst and the Wisconsin Badgers as the inside linebackers coach.

See also
 List of Green Bay Packers players

References

External links
 Miami profile

1969 births
Living people
American football linebackers
Georgia Bulldogs football coaches
Green Bay Packers players
Houston Cougars football coaches
Miami Hurricanes football coaches
Penn State Nittany Lions football players
Rutgers Scarlet Knights football coaches
Saint Peter's Peacocks football coaches
Temple Owls football coaches
Virginia Cavaliers football coaches
Sportspeople from Hoboken, New Jersey
Players of American football from New Jersey